Cross City is a town in and the county seat of Dixie County, Florida, United States.  The population was 1,728 at the 2010 census.

Geography

Cross City is located at  (29.6806, –83.0897).

Climate

Demographics

As of the census of 2000, there were 1,775 people, 686 households, and 478 families residing in the town. The racial makeup of the town was 70.48% White, 27.27% African American, 0.17% Native American, 0.56% Asian, 0.11% Pacific Islander, and 1.41% from two or more races. Hispanic or Latino of any race were 0.51% of the population.

There were 686 households, out of which 34.5% had children under the age of 18 living with them, 44.2% were married couples living together, 21.9% had a female householder with no husband present, and 30.3% were non-families. 27.0% of all households were made up of individuals, and 15.7% had someone living alone who was 65 years of age or older.  The average household size was 2.51 and the average family size was 3.04.

In the town, the population was spread out, with 30.3% under the age of 18, 8.2% from 18 to 24, 23.7% from 25 to 44, 20.1% from 45 to 64, and 17.7% who were 65 years of age or older.  The median age was 35 years. For every 100 females, there were 84.5 males.  For every 100 females age 18 and over, there were 78.2 males.

The median income for a household in the town was $20,081, and the median income for a family was $28,884. Males had a median income of $26,419 versus $18,684 for females. The per capita income for the town was $12,125.  About 20.3% of families and 27.2% of the population were below the poverty line, including 33.9% of those under age 18 and 29.1% of those age 65 or over.

Transportation

Education

Residents are served by Dixie District Schools. The schools serving Cross City are:
 Dixie County High School
 Ruth Rains Middle School
 James Anderson Elementary School

Dixie County Public Library is in Cross City. It is a part of the Three Rivers Regional Library System.

Notable people

 Nick Collins, Defensive back for the Green Bay Packers
 Duke Dawson, Defensive back for the Denver Broncos
 Eugene McDowell, professional basketball player

References

External links

County seats in Florida
Towns in Dixie County, Florida
Towns in Florida